The Mwachema River is a river of southeastern Kenya. It flows into the Indian Ocean at Diani Beach. The Indian Ocean Beach Club hotel in the Moorish style lies near the mouth of the river.

References

Rivers of Kenya